Mate Pehar (born 25 February 1988 in Čapljina) is a retired Croatian football player.

Career
In his professional career he played for NK Neretva, NK Neretvanac Opuzen, RNK Split, NK Široki Brijeg and HŠK Zrinjski Mostar. He joined Zrinjski in summer 2016 after he was deemed surplus to requirements by Široki Brijeg manager Slaven Musa. He then joined Neretva from Zrinjski in summer 2019 after spending a season on loan at Čapljina.

References

External links
 

1988 births
Living people
People from Čapljina
Croats of Bosnia and Herzegovina
Association football midfielders
Croatian footballers
NK Neretva players
NK Vrapče players
RNK Split players
NK Široki Brijeg players
HŠK Zrinjski Mostar players
HNK Čapljina players
NK Ljubuški players
Croatian Football League players
Premier League of Bosnia and Herzegovina players
Croatian expatriate footballers
Expatriate footballers in Bosnia and Herzegovina
Croatian expatriate sportspeople in Bosnia and Herzegovina